Ruth Edwards is a British Conservative Party politician.

Ruth Edwards may also refer to:

 Ruth E. Edwards, book artist
 Ruth Dudley Edwards, Irish revisionist historian and writer
 Ruth Fowler Edwards, British geneticist
 Ruth Denson Edwards, figure in the Sacred Harp movement